Syed Sibte Hasan Naqvi (مولانا سيد سبط حسن نقوى) (d. 1935) was a Shia cleric from Lucknow, Uttar Pradesh, India. He was known by the title of Khatib-E-Azam (Great Orator).

Family background

His last name "Naqvi" indicates he is one of the direct descendants of the Islamic prophet Muhammad through the lineage of the Imam Ali al-Naqi, he belonged to Nasirabadi sub-branch of Naqvis of Darul Ijtihad Jais and Nasirabad. Waris Hasan comes from Khandan-e-Ijtihad a notable family of Shia Muslim clerics of erstwhile Oudh State whose Ayatollah Syed Dildar Ali Naseerabadi Ghufran-Ma'ab Naseerabadi was Sibte's ancestor.

Syed Sibte Hasan Naqvi had a son named Syed Mohammad Waris Hasan Naqvi. Waris Hasan too was a Shia cleric and held position of Principals of institutions like Shia College, Lucknow and Madrasatul Waizeen, Lucknow.

Studies
He trained several Ulama such Kifayat Hussain, Adeel Akhtar, and Jaffer Hussain. He did Mumtazul Afazil from Jamia Nazmia where Ayatullah Najm al-Hasan Namjmul Millat was his teacher. Sibte Hasan was also the teacher of Maulana Ibne Hasan Nonaharvi.

Public life
He was most famous for refining the style of Muharram majlis to the format used today, most notably in the Urdu language. Before his time, majalises in Lucknow and other places contained marsiya, recited by great poets like Mir Anees and Mirza Dabeer. The new format has Khutba in Arabic, some tafseer, fazail of Ahlul Bayt and then masaeb of Karbala.

He has composed nauhey under pen-name Fatir Jaisi, the collection has been published as 'Hamd e Rabbul Arbaab' and Nauhe by Noore Hidayat Foundation, Lucknow.

He was one of the leading advocates of the Shia College campaign.

He created a waqf Shamsul Ulema Maulana Syed Sibte Hasan Naqvi on 10 April 1933, of which Waris Hasan his son became mutwalli (caretaker).

Justine Jones has described Maulana as,

References 

Ijtihadi family
Indian Islamic religious leaders
Scholars from Lucknow
Indian Shia Muslims
Year of death missing
Year of birth missing

External links
 , Published on Nov 6, 2016  by Noor-e-Hidayat Foundation, Lucknow, India.